The Hero of Venice (Italian: Il bravo di Venezia) is a 1941 Italian historical adventure film directed by Carlo Campogalliani and starring Gustav Diessl, Paola Barbara, Rossano Brazzi and Valentina Cortese.

It was shot at the Scalera Studios in Rome. The film's sets were designed by the art directors Gustav Abel and Amleto Bonetti.

Synopsis
Marco Fuser, an outlaw. returns to Venice after many years. His son who works in the studio of a celebrated painter is unaware of his father's history. Arrested by the Doge's men, Marco agrees to become a bravo in the service of the city's ruler and kill his enemies. He enjoys some success at this, until he finds he has been tasked with killing his son.

Cast

References

Bibliography 
 Damiani, Ludovica.  Set in Venice: il cinema a Venezia : scatti, protagonisti, racconti. Electa, 2009.

External links 
 

1941 films
1941 adventure films
1940s historical adventure films
Italian historical adventure films
1940s Italian-language films
Films directed by Carlo Campogalliani
Italian black-and-white films
Films shot at Scalera Studios
Films set in Venice
Films set in the 16th century
1940s Italian films